Eğlence or Zinol is a village in the Midyat District of Mardin Province in Turkey. The village had a population of 195 in 2021.

Information 
The village has been described as an Arab village where Kurdish is spoken, but also as a Kurdish village of the Mizizex tribe.

References 

Villages in Midyat District
Arab settlements in Mardin Province
Kurdish settlements in Mardin Province